How I Wonder What You Are is a 2010 drama film directed by Udaya Dharmawardhana and  Chinthana Dharmadasa.  The film is a low budget production and is claimed to be from the first independent cinema in Sri Lanka.

Plot 
The plot is a story of two youths who are engaged on a soul searching mission. D (played by Prasanna Mahaganage) is a youth of 29 who is frustrated with life not having a reason to live. He yearns for some form of connection, when Kathy (played by Purnima Mohandiram) visits him. She comes to D after a little crash with her partner KK (played by Namal Jayasinghe). Kathy is waiting for a call from her boyfriend to confirm that he still needs her, but the call never comes. D and Kathy spend a day waiting, yet nothing happens. D and Kathy make desperate attempts to reveal their emotions to each other, but they soon realize that they have forgotten the language of connectivity. However, D began to create dreams around her. Unable to face the trauma of nothingness and emptiness, Kathy leaves, leaving D behind in a state more heartbroken than before and waiting for her to return.

Cast 
 Prasanna Mahagamage as "D"
 Purnima Muhandiram as Kathy
 Namal Jayasinghe as "KK"
 Mahendra Perera
 Dayadeva Edirisinghe
 Sirimal Wijesinghe

Production 
The movie was shot in numerous locations in Colombo, Sri Lanka. The directors raised their budget with the collaboration of colleagues. Several cast and crew members worked without pay.

Music 
The original score was composed by Jayanth Dharmawardhana. The theme song of the movie "Adare Anshu Mathrayak" (Descending from Paradise) is performed by Indrachapa Liyanage and written by Asoka Handagama.

Release 
The film was officially premiered at the National Film Corporation theater on April 30, 2010, for a selected audience. Producers claim that they are going to use alternative methods for public screening.

References

External links 
 
 Official Facebook Group
 Summary of film

2010 films
2010s Sinhala-language films
2010 drama films
Films set in the 2000s
Sri Lankan drama films